Choon is a village in the Budgam district in the Indian-administered union territory of Jammu and Kashmir.

Demographics
, the total population of Choon is 1,819 of which 941 are males and 878 are females. Total number of households in the village is 289. Population of the children with age group 0-6 is 181 of which 92 are males and the remaining 89 are females. Literacy rate of the village is 45.79%, lower than the former state average of 67.16%. In Choon, total number of literates are 833 of which 499 are males and 334 are females.
4G Internet is Available but Speed Slow.
There is Only 1 medical Shops.No big Market. Horticulture is the predominant sector of the economy of this Area .

References

Villages in Budgam district